The Dominican ambassador in Beijing is the official representative of the government in Santo Domingo to the government in Beijing.

In July 2004, Taiwan was assured by the Dominican Republic that it would not switch its diplomatic recognition from Taipei to Beijing, even though it had established business ties with China.
When Leonel Fernández was president-elect, he told Taiwan's ambassador that the new government will continue to recognize Taiwan.
China opened a commercial liaison office in the Dominican Republic, but the long-standing friendship between Taiwan and the Dominican Republic will remain unchanged, but the D.R. will have commercial ties with China.

List of representatives

Dominican Republic–Taiwan relations
China–Dominican Republic relations

References 

 
China
Dominican Republic